11th National Assembly may refer to:

 11th National Assembly of France
 11th National Assembly of Pakistan
 11th National Assembly of Serbia
 11th National Assembly of South Korea
 11th National Assembly of Vietnam